Edward, Ed or Eddie Cole may refer to:

 Edward William Cole (1832–1918), Australian businessman, entrepreneur and publisher
 Edward B. Cole (1879–1918), United States Marine Corps officer
 Edward M. Cole, newspaper editor and politician from New York
 Ed Cole (Edward Nicholas Cole, 1909–1977), American car manufacturer
 E. Nelson Cole (Edward Nelson Cole, born 1937), Democratic member of the North Carolina General Assembly
 Edward Cole (1549–1617), MP for Winchester
 Ed Cole (baseball) (Edward William Cole, 1909–1999), Major League Baseball pitcher
 Ned Cole (1917–2002), Episcopal bishop in the USA, Bishop of Central New York
 Eddie Cole (1910–1970), American musician
 Eddie Cole (American football) (1919–2015), American football player and coach

See also
Ted Cole (disambiguation)
Edwin Cole (disambiguation)